Fabbriche di Vergemoli is a comune (municipality) in the Province of Lucca in the Italian region of Tuscany. It was created on 1 January 2014 from the merger of Fabbriche di Vallico and Vergemoli.

References